Climăuți is a village in Dondușeni District, Moldova.

References

Villages of Dondușeni District
Soroksky Uyezd
Soroca County (Romania)